Colombia competed at the 2004 Summer Olympics in Athens, Greece, from 13 to 29 August 2004. This was the nation's sixteenth appearance at the Olympics, except the 1952 Summer Olympics in Helsinki.

Comité Olímpico Colombiano sent the nation's largest delegation to the Games since 1972. A total of 53 athletes, 32 men and 21 women, took part in 18 sports. Ten Colombian athletes had previously competed in Sydney, including tennis player Fabiola Zuluaga in the women's singles, road cyclist Víctor Hugo Peña, and weightlifter Carmenza Delgado, who became the nation's flag bearer in the opening ceremony.

Colombia left Athens with a total of two Olympic bronze medals, which were both awarded to weightlifter Mabel Mosquera, and track cyclist María Luisa Calle in the women's points race. Originally, Calle finished in the bronze medal position, but was later disqualified under a strict liability rule after she had been tested positive for the banned stimulant heptaminol, handing the medal over to U.S. cyclist Erin Mirabella. As a result of the International Olympic Committee's decision on November 23, 2005, the bronze medal was officially reinstated to Calle after this had been proven to be a false positive due to isometheptene presence in an analgesic prescribed during the competition.

Medalists

Athletics 

Colombian athletes have so far achieved qualifying standards in the following athletics events (up to a maximum of 3 athletes in each event at the 'A' Standard, and 1 at the 'B' Standard).

Key
 Note–Ranks given for track events are within the athlete's heat only
 Q = Qualified for the next round
 q = Qualified for the next round as a fastest loser or, in field events, by position without achieving the qualifying target
 NR = National record
 N/A = Round not applicable for the event
 Bye = Athlete not required to compete in round

Men
Track & road events

Women
Track & road events

Field events

Boxing

Colombia sent five boxers to Athens.  Three lost their first matches, while two won once before being defeated.  Juan Camilo Novoa was the most successful, as he made it to the quarterfinals after having a bye in his first round and winning his bout in the round of 16.

Cycling

Road

Track
Pursuit

Time trial

Omnium

Diving 

Colombian divers qualified for two individual spots at the 2004 Olympic Games.

Men

Equestrian

Dressage

Fencing

Colombia has qualified a single fencer.

Women

Gymnastics

Artistic
Men

Judo

Three Colombian judoka (two males and one female) qualified for the 2004 Summer Olympics.

Shooting 

Three Colombian shooters (two men and one woman) qualified to compete in the following events:

Men

Women

Swimming 

Colombian swimmers earned qualifying standards in the following events (up to a maximum of 2 swimmers in each event at the A-standard time, and 1 at the B-standard time):

Men

Women

Taekwondo

Three Colombian taekwondo jin qualified for the following events.

Tennis

Two Colombian tennis players qualified for the following events.

Triathlon

Colombia has qualified a single triathlete.

Weightlifting 

Nine Colombian weightlifters qualified for the following events:

Men

Women

Wrestling 

Key
  - Victory by Fall.
  - Decision by Points - the loser with technical points.
  - Decision by Points - the loser without technical points.

Men's Greco-Roman

See also
 Colombia at the 2003 Pan American Games
 Colombia at the 2004 Summer Paralympics

References

External links
Official Report of the XXVIII Olympiad
Comité Olímpico Colombiano 

Nations at the 2004 Summer Olympics
2004
Summer Olympics